Marcel Oerlemars (born 12 January 1969) is a Dutch former footballer He has played most of the time in the Dutch Eredivisie or the Austrian Bundesliga. Except 1999 when he played one summer in the Icelandic premier league for Fram Reykjavik.

References 

 

1969 births
Living people
Dutch footballers
Eerste Divisie players
Austrian Football Bundesliga players
2. Liga (Austria) players
AFC DWS players
SC Telstar players
First Vienna FC players
SV Ried players
HFC Haarlem players
FC Admira Wacker Mödling players
FC Türkiyemspor players
Dutch expatriate footballers
Expatriate footballers in Austria
Expatriate footballers in Iceland
Association football forwards
Footballers from Amsterdam